Louis Raymond Passat (28 December 1913 – 16 June 1988) was a French professional road bicycle racer. Passat won one stage in the 1937 Tour de France, and one stage in the 1939 Tour de France. He was born in Doyet.

Major results

1937
Tour de France:
Winner stage 19A
1939
Circuit de Sologne
Tour de France:
Winner stage 7

References

External links 

French male cyclists
1913 births
1988 deaths
French Tour de France stage winners
Sportspeople from Allier
Cyclists from Auvergne-Rhône-Alpes